Smolanka may refer to the following places:
Smolanka, Masovian Voivodeship (east-central Poland)
Smolanka, Podlaskie Voivodeship (north-east Poland)
Smolanka, Warmian-Masurian Voivodeship (north Poland)